Carsten Baumann (born 7 October 1946) is a German former professional footballer who played as a forward.

References

External links
 

Living people
1946 births
Association football forwards
German footballers
SV Werder Bremen players
SV Werder Bremen II players
VfL Osnabrück players
KSV Hessen Kassel players
20th-century German people